Triin is an Estonian feminine given name. Triinu is another version of Triin. It is a form of Katherine. It is likely that the name Triin derives from the North Germanic name Trina which was first documented in 1652, in Sweden. The name is common in Estonia, and may refer to any of the following persons:

Triin Aljand (born 1985), Estonian swimmer
Triin Narva (born 1994), Estonian chess player
Triin Ojaste (born 1990), Estonian cross-country skier
Triin Tenso (born 1987), Estonian actress
Triin Tobi (born 1995), Estonian alpine skier
Triin Vahisalu (born 1978), Estonian botanist

References

Estonian feminine given names